"Miracles Happen (When You Believe)" is a song by American singer Myra. It was the second single from her 2001 self-titled album Myra. The song was also used as the promotional track for the 2001 Disney film The Princess Diaries. In 2002, it received an ALMA Award nomination for "Outstanding Song in a Motion Picture Soundtrack".

The song was also remixed and released on a remix EP by Grammy-nominated Italian composer, songwriter and producer, Marco Marinangeli. The remix EP saw only promotional use.

In 2002, a Spanish version of the song called "Siempre Hay Milagros" was released to promote the singer and film to the Spanish-speaking market. The new lyrics were co-written also by Marinangeli.

"Miracles Happen (When You Believe)" is written and composed in the key of E major but in the third chorus a semitone is modulate to F Major, it is built of the chord progression E- B(add4)- C♯- A and is set in time signature of common time with a tempo of 112 beats per minute. Myra´s vocal range spans from G♯3 to F5

Music video 
The music video directed by Scott Marshall was released to promote Myra as well as the film. It was shot in a mall in California and features Myra and some girls going to Limited Too for a fashion and shopping spree and to meet with boys. It was choreographed by Darrin Henson and featured four background dancers whom also accompanied Myra in her live concert and television performances of the song.

In 2002, another music video was released for the Spanish version, "Siempre Hay Milagros". The new music video was directed by Brian Smith and produced by Braddon Mendelson. The 2002 version borrowed clips from its original English version.

Track listing

Charts

References 

2001 songs
Disney songs
Songs written by Eliot Kennedy
Songs written by Pam Sheyne
Walt Disney Records singles
Avex Trax singles